Forever Vienna is the 2009 album released by violinist André Rieu. It was released as a double CD and DVD album. The DVD was recorded at the Royal Albert Hall and has some special features which include: My Home Town, photo gallery and discography. The album entered the Irish Album Charts on 4 February 2010 at number 53, it then climbed 49 places to its peak of number 4 the next week. It entered the UK Albums Chart on 3 January 2010 at number 22 and peaked at number 2.

Track listing; CD
"The Blue Danube" - 7:57
"Radetzky March" - 3:10
"The Second Waltz" - 3:44
"Voices Of Spring" - 5:26
"Strauss & Co." - 3:50
"Bolero" - 6:46
"Vienna Blood" - 7:21
"Perpetuum Mobile" - 2:56
"Wine, Woman And Song" - 6:19
"Thunder And Lightning Polka" - 2:37
"Carnaval De Venise" - 4:37
"The Gypsy Baron" - 4:23
"The Merry Widow" - 3:03
"On Holiday" - 2:12
"Vilja Song" - 5:37
"You Are My Heart's Delight" - 3:31
"Strauss Party" - 3:26

Charts

Weekly charts

Year-end charts

References

External links

2009 classical albums